Lavi is a kibbutz in northern Israel. 

Lavi may also refer to:

Lavi, Estonia, a village in Estonia
Lavi (name)
 IAI Lavi, an Israeli fighter aircraft
 Lavi (D.Gray-man), a manga and anime character in D.Gray-man series
 Lavi language, a Mon-Khmer language of southern Laos
 Left atrial volume index (LAVI), an indicator of the volume of the left atrium

See also

 General Motors LAV I (LAV 1) wheeled light armoured vehicle

 lav (disambiguation)
 Lavie (disambiguation)
 Lavin (disambiguation)
 Levi (disambiguation)
 Livi (disambiguation)
 Lovi (disambiguation)